USS Attu (CVE-102) was a  of the United States Navy. She was named after the Battle of Attu in the Aleutian Islands and was built for service during World War II. Launched in May 1944, and commissioned in June, she served as a transport carrier, ferrying aircraft, and as a replenishment carrier, supporting the Invasion of Iwo Jima and the Battle of Okinawa. Postwar, she participated in Operation Magic Carpet. She was decommissioned in June 1946, and sold for scrapping in January 1947. After a failed acquisition attempt by the Jewish Agency, she was ultimately scrapped in 1949.

Design and description

Attu was a Casablanca-class escort carrier, the most numerous type of aircraft carriers ever built, and designed specifically to be mass-produced using prefabricated sections, in order to replace heavy early war losses. She displaced  standard,  with a full load. She was powered with two Skinner Unaflow reciprocating steam engines, which drove two shafts, providing , thus enabling her to make . Her compact size necessitated the installment of an aircraft catapult at her bow, and there were two aircraft elevators to facilitate movement of aircraft between the flight and hangar deck: one each fore and aft.

One /38 caliber dual-purpose gun was mounted on the stern. Anti-aircraft defense was provided by eight  Bofors anti-aircraft guns in single mounts, as well as twelve  Oerlikon cannons, which were mounted around the perimeter of the deck. By the end of the war, Casablanca-class carriers had been modified to carry thirty 20-mm cannons, and the amount of 40-mm guns had been doubled to sixteen, by putting them into twin mounts. These modifications were in response to increasing casualties due to kamikaze attacks. Casablanca-class escort carriers were designed to carry 27 aircraft, but the hangar deck could accommodate more.

Construction
Her construction was awarded to Kaiser Shipbuilding Company, Vancouver, Washington under a Maritime Commission contract, on 18 June 1942. She was ordered under the name Elbour Bay (a misspelling of "Elbow Bay"), as part of a tradition which named escort carriers after bays or sounds in Alaska. She was renamed Attu, after the Battle of Attu, on 6 November 1943, as part of a new naval policy which named subsequent Casablanca-class carriers after naval or land engagements. The escort carrier was laid down on 16 March 1944, MC hull 1139, the forty-seventh of a series of fifty Casablanca-class escort carriers. She was launched on 27 May 1944; sponsored by Mrs. George W. Steele; transferred to the United States Navy and commissioned on 30 June 1944, with Captain Henry Fahnestock MacComsey in command.

Service history

World War II

Upon being commissioned, Attu underwent a shakedown cruise down the West Coast to San Diego. On 7 August, she departed San Diego, transporting aircraft and passengers to Pearl Harbor. She then took on another load of aircraft and personnel, and proceeded west, making stops at Guadalcanal and Espiritu Santo. Upon finishing her transport run, she got underway on her return trip on 31 August. She arrived at San Diego on 13 September, where overhaul was conducted. On 28 September, she sailed north to Alameda, California, where she loaded fuel, supplies, and replenishment aircraft.

She departed the West Coast on 1 October, bound for Finschhafen, New Guinea, arriving there on 18 October. She then stopped at Seeadler Harbor in Manus Island, before returning via Pearl Harbor back to Alameda. She departed yet again on 23 November, bound for Pearl Harbor. Upon arriving, she began ferrying supplies and troops between Pearl Harbor and Guam. She finished her duties and returned to San Diego on 4 January 1945. After a short period of rest, she sailed again on 20 January, arriving at Pearl Harbor on 27 January. There, she conducted gunnery exercises in the waters off of Oahu. She concluded her exercises and steamed for Enewetak Atoll on 1 February. Pausing briefly, she proceeded onwards to Ulithi. This task group was responsible for ferrying and transferring replenishment aircraft to the frontline Fifth Fleet and its carriers, which were supporting the Invasion of Iwo Jima.

After transferring all of her aircraft, Attu returned to Guam for replacement of her aircraft and supplies. She then sailed westwards again, and served as a replenishment carrier again, this time in support of the landings on Okinawa. This time, her task group was responsible for resupplying both the escort carriers and the fleet carriers operating over the island. On 4 June, were being refueled by tankers, east of Okinawa. Throughout the day, winds began to pick up, and refueling operations had ceased by the time tropical storm force winds were reported in the late afternoon. In fact, Attus task group was directly in the path of Typhoon Connie, which was proceeding northwards. As Admiral William Halsey Jr., the commander of the Third Fleet, got word of the typhoon, his orders ended up driving a large part of his fleet directly into the path of the incoming storm. Amazingly, Halsey had previously blundered his way into Typhoon Cobra, with much damage and loss of life, in December 1944. As part of the Logistics Support Group, Attu witnessed the worst of the damage, weathering the eyewall of the storm.

As night fell, it became evident that the task group could not avoid encountering the typhoon. The storm's eyewall struck on the early morning of 5 June, and by 3:30, hurricane-force winds had already been reported. At around 4:00, some flags tore off Attu, and wrapped around her radarscope, rendering her blind to the location of the other ships around her. Consequently, she only narrowly avoided, with careful manipulation of the engines, a collision with the tankers. The typhoon's winds blew several aircraft on board her flight deck off her side, and rendered inoperational or otherwise damaged many more. As she passed through the eye of the storm, the crew managed to unfurl the flags blocking her radar, enabling her to pass through the second half of the storm without much further damage.

On 10 June, Captain Paul Hubert Ramsey took over command of the vessel. In early July, she retired back to San Diego for much belayed repairs of her typhoon damage. On 24 July, with repairs quickly concluded, she steamed westwards. She was sailing through a fueling area in the West Pacific when news of the Japanese surrender broke.

Post-war
Following the end of the war, she sailed back to California, arriving on 11 November. On 25 November, she joined the "Magic Carpet" fleet, which repatriated U.S. servicemen from throughout the Pacific. She cruised around the Pacific, making stops and returning U.S. servicemen back to the mainland. She completed her "Magic Carpet" duties, and was discharged in early 1946.

By May 1946, Attu was slated for disposal by the Navy. She sailed for Norfolk, Virginia, passing through the Panama Canal and making a stop at Jacksonville, Florida. She was decommissioned on 8 June, and she was struck from the Navy list on 3 July.

After Attu was decommissioned, she was acquired by representatives of the Jewish Agency in New York. The representatives, led by Yehuda Arazi, planned to use the ship to transport up to 10,000 Jews to Palestine, where they wanted to establish a Jewish state. In addition, they planned to utilize the carrier to ferry a large quantity of armaments for the Haganah, the paramilitary precursor of what would become the Israeli Defense Forces in 1948. An initial payment of about $10,000 was arranged, and a refit was scheduled to prepare the ship. However, the United States Department of State discovered the plan and cancelled the deal; this allowed Attu to be scrapped in 1949. Attu received two battle stars for her World War II service.

References

Sources

Online sources

Bibliography

External links 

 
 Cruise Book of USS Attu (CVE-102)

Casablanca-class escort carriers
World War II escort aircraft carriers of the United States
Ships built in Vancouver, Washington
1944 ships
S4-S2-BB3 ships